Arshakyan is an Armenian surname. Notable people with the surname include:

David Arshakyan (born 1994), Armenian footballer
Hakob Arshakyan (born 1985), Armenian politician
Inga and Anush Arshakyan (born 1980 and 1982), Armenian folk singers

Armenian-language surnames